Turners Station is an unincorporated community within Henry County, Kentucky, United States.

History
Turners Station was a station on the Louisville and Cincinnati Railroad. A post office was established at Turners Station in 1879, and remained in operation until it was discontinued in 1995.

References

Unincorporated communities in Henry County, Kentucky
Unincorporated communities in Kentucky